The Peace of Roaring River is a lost 1919 American silent Western film produced and distributed by Goldwyn Pictures and starring Pauline Frederick. Hobart Henley and Victor Schertzinger directed the production.

Plot
As described in a film magazine, Hugo Ennis (Holding), a man's man, refuses to capitulate to the wooing of Sophy McGurn (Barker), the postmistress, which arouses her resentment. She puts an advertisement in a matrimonial newspaper and answers the replies in his name. This causes little Madge Nelson (Frederick) of Omaha, Nebraska, to come to the little town. Her recent illness has left her penniless and friendless. She goes to Ennis' cabin. Ennis returns, thinks he smells a blackmailing scheme, and during the argument that follows is shot by Madge. Madge summons a doctor and saves the life of Ennis. Sophy leads a delegation of the town's women to drive Madge out of the community. Ennis recovers consciousness and, discovering that he loves Madge, persuades her to stay. He outwits the designing Sophy and marries Madge.

Cast
 Pauline Frederick as Madge Nelson
 Hardee Kirkland as Nils Olsen
 Corinne Barker as Sophy McGurn
 Lydia Yeamans Titus as Landlady
 Eddie Sturgis as Kid Follansbee
 Thomas Holding as Hugo Ennis

References

External links

 
 

1919 films
1919 Western (genre) films
1919 lost films
1919 drama films
Films directed by Hobart Henley
Films directed by Victor Schertzinger
Lost Western (genre) films
Goldwyn Pictures films
American black-and-white films
Lost American films
Silent American Western (genre) films
1910s American films
1910s English-language films